Shelby is a census-designated place and unincorporated community in Shelby County, Alabama, United States. Its population was 1,044 as of the 2010 census. The area is near Lay Lake and Waxahatchee Creek. Shelby Iron Park is located at the heart of the area. Two sites in Shelby, The Brick House and the Old Shelby Hotel, are listed on the Alabama Register of Landmarks and Heritage.

History
Shelby was home to the Shelby Iron Company. During the American Civil War, iron plating from the iron works was used on the CSS Tennessee, CSS Huntsville, and CSS Tuscaloosa. At this time, Shelby was connected to Columbiana by the Shelby Iron Company Railroad, which allowed the iron works to be connected to the Alabama and Tennessee River Railroad. A detachment of General Emory Upton's division of Wilson's Raiders destroyed the ironworks on March 31, 1865.

Demographics

Shelby Iron Works was listed on the 1880 U.S. Census and was shortened to Shelby in 1890 as an incorporated town. It did not appear again as a separately returned community until 120 years later in 2010 as a census-designated place.

References

Census-designated places in Shelby County, Alabama
Census-designated places in Alabama